Prakash Vishvanath Paranjape (28 July 1947 – 20 February 2008) was a member of the Lok Sabha representing the constituency of Thane. He was a member of the Shiv Sena party and served as a member of the Lok Sabha from 1996 until his death.

Paranjape was born in Panvel, Maharashtra on 28 July 1947. Before being elected to Parliament he held several posts in the Thane local government. He married Supriya Prakash Paranjpe on 15 May 1972.

Paranjape died on 20 February 2008, aged 60, following a long battle with cancer.

External links
 

1947 births
2008 deaths
India MPs 2004–2009
People from Maharashtra
Deaths from cancer in India
Politicians from Thane
Marathi politicians
People from Raigad district
India MPs 1999–2004
India MPs 1998–1999
India MPs 1996–1997
Shiv Sena politicians
Lok Sabha members from Maharashtra
Politics of Thane district